Pennpada is a 1975 Indian Malayalam-language film,  directed by Crossbelt Mani and produced by C. P. Sreedharan, P. Appu Nair and K. V. Nair. The film stars Rajakokila, Reena, Vijayalalitha and Vincent. The film's score is composed by R. K. Shekhar.

Cast

Rajakokila as Radha
Reena as Latha
Vijayalalitha as Sreedevi / Geetha
K. P. Ummer as Raghavan
Vincent as Venu
Sudheer as Chandran
Adoor Bhasi as Bhaskara Pillai
Bahadoor as Vasu
Sreelatha Namboothiri as Gourikkutty
Alummoodan as Kunjiraman
Janardanan as Panicker
KPAC Sunny as Ramdas
Kuthiravattam Pappu as Janaki (Transvestite)
Mallika Sukumaran as Ammukkutty
Meena as Meenakshi Chechi
N. Govindankutty as Kolla Sangha Thalavan
Nellikode Bhaskaran as Gurukkal
T. P. Madhavan as DSP

Soundtrack
The music was composed by R. K. Shekhar with lyrics by Vayalar and Bharanikkavu Sivakumar.

References

External links
 

1975 films
1970s Malayalam-language films